Timbuka is a genus of anyphaenid sac spiders first described by Antônio Brescovit in 1997.

Species
 it contains six species:
Timbuka bogotensis (L. Koch, 1866) – Colombia, Bolivia
Timbuka boquete Brescovit, 1997 – Costa Rica, Panama, Colombia
Timbuka granadensis (Keyserling, 1879) – Colombia
Timbuka larvata (O. Pickard-Cambridge, 1896) – Mexico
Timbuka masseneti (Berland, 1913) – Ecuador
Timbuka meridiana (L. Koch, 1866) – Colombia

References

Anyphaenidae
Araneomorphae genera
Spiders of North America
Spiders of South America
Taxa named by Antônio Brescovit